Mahmoud Tighnavard is a defensive midfielder, he started his career with Iranjavan he currently plays for  Baadraan Tehran. The newly promoted team has high expectations, Mahmoud was one of the players that was in a transfer deal in Azadegan League.

Mes Kerman
Mahmoud Tighnavard was used for Mes Kerman in 2013–2014 season in Iran Pro League. He played 13 games with 5 losses and 8 draws which was not good, Mes Kerman relegated the league.

Naft Masjed Soleyman
He got transferred to Naft in 2014. He played his first game against Rah Ahan with a 2-2 draw.

Honours
Iranjavan
Azadegan League (1): 2011–12 (Runners Up)

References

Association football midfielders
Iranian footballers
Living people
1983 births
Naft Masjed Soleyman F.C. players
Sanat Mes Kerman F.C. players
Aluminium Hormozgan F.C. players
Esteghlal Khuzestan F.C. players